Schaumburg is a district in Lower Saxony, Germany. Schauenburg is a municipality in Hesse

Schaumburg or Schauenburg, often used interchangeably, may also refer to:

People
 Balthazar Alexis Henri Schauenburg (1748–1838), general of the French Revolutionary Wars and Napoleonic Wars
 House of Schaumburg, a regional German dynasty ruling the counties of Schaumburg and Holstein
 Jules Henri Jean Schaumburg (1839–1886), Belgian painter, who was Louis Rousselet's travelling companion in India from May 1865 to September 1868

Places and territories
 County of Schaumburg, a former county of the Holy Roman Empire in modern-day Lower Saxony, Germany
 County of Schaunberg (also Schaumberg), a former county of the Holy Roman Empire in modern-day Upper Austria
 Schaumburg, Illinois, a village in Illinois, United States
 Schaumburg (Metra), a transit station in the city
 Schaumburg Township, Cook County, Illinois

Castles and palaces
 Schaumburg Castle, Lower Saxony (Burg Schaumburg), a castle in the district of Schaumburg in Lower Saxony
 Schaumburg Castle, Rhineland-Palatinate (Schloss Schaumburg), a castle in the district of Rhein-Lahn in Rhineland-Palatinate
 Burgruine Schaumburg, a ruined castle in Carinthia, Austria
 Palais Schaumburg in Bonn, the second official residence and office of the Chancellor of Germany
 Schauenburg Castle, three different ruined castles with the same name

See also
 Schauenburg (disambiguation)
 Schomburg (disambiguation)